Lipstadt is a surname. Notable people with the surname include:

Aaron Lipstadt (born 1952), American director and producer
Deborah Lipstadt (born 1947), American professor

See also
Lippestad
Lippstadt